Euchrysops osiris, the Osiris smoky blue or African Cupid, is a butterfly of the family Lycaenidae. It is found in southern Arabia, Madagascar, the Comoro Islands and Africa, south of the Sahara.

The wingspan is 22–29 mm for males and 25–30 mm for females. Adults are mainly on wing from September to November and from February to April, but may be found year-round. There are two main generations per year.

The larvae feed on Rhynchosia totta, Vigna tenuis and Vigna unguiculata.

References

Butterflies described in 1855
Euchrysops
Lepidoptera of Cape Verde
Butterflies of Africa